St Joseph's College (Irish: Coláiste Naomh Seosamh) is a Catholic secondary school located in Coalisland, County Tyrone, Northern Ireland.

Academics
The college provides the standard five years of secondary education consisting of Key Stage 3 from Year 8 until Year 10, and two-year GCSE courses from Year 11 until Year 12 in Key Stage 4. It also provides a Post 16 Qualification Enhancement Programme. In 2018, 47.2% of its entrants achieved five or more GCSEs at grades A* to C, including the core subjects English and Maths.

Children whose normal place of residence is within the contributory parishes of Ballyclog/Donaghenry (Stewartstown/Coalisland), Clonoe, Dungannon, Drummullan, Pomeroy and Ardboe receive first priority after those in special care.

References

External links
 
 Twitter

Coalisland
Catholic secondary schools in Northern Ireland
Secondary schools in County Tyrone